Kali Fajardo-Anstine is an American novelist and short story writer from Denver, Colorado. Her short stories have appeared in Electric Literature, The American Scholar, and the Boston Review. In 2020, she was the American Book Award winner for Sabrina & Corina: Stories. Her first novel, Woman of Light: A Novel (2022), is a national bestseller.

Biography 
Kali Fajardo-Anstine was born in Denver, Colorado.

Fajardo-Anstine's work often features Latina and Native American women in Colorado the American West. She holds a B.A. from Metropolitan State University and an MFA from the University of Wyoming. She has been named the Texas State University MFA program's Endowed Chair in Creative Writing for 2022-2023.

Selected works 

 Novels
 Woman of Light: A Novel (June 2022) 

 Short story collection
 Sabrina & Corina: Stories (October 2019) 

 Short stories
 "Remedies" in Electric Literature
 "All Her Names" in The American Scholar
 "The Yellow Ranch" in O, The Oprah Magazine
 "Star" in Freeman's: Animals

 Essays
 "But You Can’t Stay Here" in Harper's Bazaar

Awards and honors 
 2019, National Book Award Finalist for Sabrina & Corina: Stories
 2020, American Book Award Winner for Sabrina & Corina: Stories
2023, Carol Shields Prize for Fiction Longlist for Woman of Light

References

External links 

 

Living people
American short story writers
American women novelists
Hispanic and Latino American novelists
Hispanic and Latino American short story writers
Writers from Denver
Metropolitan State University of Denver alumni
University of Wyoming alumni
21st-century American women
1986 births